Illegal settlements may refer to:

 Settler colonialism
 Ba'athist Arabization campaigns in North Iraq
 Indonesian transmigration program
 Israeli settlements
 Moroccan settlements
 Pashtun colonization of northern Afghanistan
 Turkish settlers in Northern Cyprus
 Western European colonialism and colonization
 European colonization of the Americas
 European colonization of India

 Squatting

 Illegal agreements or illegal arrangements:
 Settlement (closing), the final step in executing a real estate transaction
 Settlement (finance), where securities are delivered against payment of money
 Settlement (litigation), a resolution between disputing parties about a legal case
 Settlement (trust), a deed whereby property is given by a settlor into trust 
 Structured settlement, a negotiated financial or insurance arrangement